The 2021 Moselle Open was a tennis tournament played on indoor hard courts. It was the 23rd edition of the Moselle Open, and part of the ATP Tour 250 series of the 2021 ATP Tour. It took place at the Arènes de Metz from 20 September to 26 September 2021.

Champions

Singles

  Hubert Hurkacz def.  Pablo Carreño Busta 7–6(7–2), 6–3

Doubles

  Hubert Hurkacz /  Jan Zieliński def.  Hugo Nys /  Arthur Rinderknech, 7–5, 6–3

Singles main-draw entrants

Seeds

 1 Rankings are as of 13 September 2021

Other entrants
The following players received wildcards into the singles main draw:
  Grégoire Barrère
  Andy Murray
  Lucas Pouille

The following player was accepted directly into the main draw using a protected ranking:
  Gilles Simon

The following player received entry as an alternate:
  Mikael Ymer

The following players received entry from the qualifying draw:
  Peter Gojowczyk
  Alexandre Müller
  Holger Rune
  Brayden Schnur

The following players received entry as lucky losers:
  Antoine Hoang
  Philipp Kohlschreiber
  Bernabé Zapata Miralles

Withdrawals 
Before the tournament
  Carlos Alcaraz → replaced by  Marco Cecchinato
  Jérémy Chardy → replaced by  Mikael Ymer
  David Goffin → replaced by  Arthur Rinderknech
  Yoshihito Nishioka → replaced by  Antoine Hoang
  Alexei Popyrin → replaced by  Bernabé Zapata Miralles
  Jannik Sinner → replaced by  Philipp Kohlschreiber

Doubles main-draw entrants

Seeds

 Rankings are as of 13 September 2021

Other entrants
The following pairs received wildcards into the doubles main draw:
  Dan Added /  Ugo Humbert
  Grégoire Barrère /  Lucas Pouille

The following pair received entry as alternates:
  Hunter Reese /  Sem Verbeek

Withdrawals
Before the tournament
  Jérémy Chardy /  Łukasz Kubot → replaced by  Szymon Walków /  Igor Zelenay
  Ariel Behar /  Gonzalo Escobar → replaced by  Marcos Giron /  Albano Olivetti
  Alejandro Davidovich Fokina /  Pedro Martínez → replaced by  Hunter Reese /  Sem Verbeek
  Sander Gillé /  Joran Vliegen → replaced by  Ivan Sabanov /  Matej Sabanov
  Ken Skupski /  Neal Skupski → replaced by  Matt Reid /  Ken Skupski

References

External links
Official website

2021 ATP Tour
2021 in French tennis
September 2021 sports events in France